Jamul is a town and a nagar palika in Durg district in the Indian state of Chhattisgarh.

Geography
It has an average elevation of 297 metres (974 feet).

Demographics
 India census, Jamul had a population of 21,633. Males constitute 52% of the population and females 48%. Jamul has an average literacy rate of 69%, higher than the national average of 59.5%: male literacy is 78%, and female literacy is 59%. In Jamul, 14% of the population is under 6 years of age.

References

Cities and towns in Durg district